Ellen Hart (born August 10, 1949) is the award-winning mystery author of the Jane Lawless and Sophie Greenway series. Born in Maine, she was a professional chef for 14 years. Hart's mysteries include culinary elements similar to those of Diane Mott Davidson.

Life and career
The author says of her work, "I don't write about the Mean Streets. I don't live there .... I don't do lots of blood and gore. I don't do sex scenes in any great detail. I'd never kill a dog or a cat. I guess you could call my style, maximal suspense and minimal gore." Hart is openly lesbian.  Her Jane Lawless series features a lesbian restaurateur and her smart mouth best friend, Cordelia Thorn. The Jane Lawless series began in 1989 and is an early post-Stonewall example of the mystery genre in lesbian literature. Hart's novels deal with LGBT issues and five of the Lawless series have won Lambda Literary Awards.

Dubbed the "lesbian answer to Agatha Christie, " for her Jane Lawless series, Hart also pens the culinary Sophie Greenway mystery series. She frequently tours and lectures on the craft of mystery writing. She has contributed to numerous crime writer anthologies including Resort to Murder: Thirteen More Tales of Mystery by Minnesota's Premier Writers.

In 2005, Hart was inducted into the Saints and Sinners Hall of Fame, joining literary greats such as Dorothy Allison, Felice Picano, Katherine V. Forrest, and others. At the 2007 annual meeting of the Golden Crown Literary Society, Hart was the keynote speaker. Nominated twenty-three times for the Lambda Literary Award, Hart has won six.

In 2010, Hart won the Trailblazer Award from the Golden Crown Literary Society which honours the contributions of lesbian writers. Previous winners include Ann Bannon, Jane Rule, and Lee Lynch. In 2017, she became the first openly LGBT writer to be named a Grand Master by the Mystery Writers of America.

She is a founding member of The Minnesota Crime Wave along with Twin Cities crime-fiction writers Carl Brookins and William Kent Krueger. The Minnesota Crime Wave's TV show about mysteries and writing airs on CTV-15 in the Twin Cities or episodes can be seen at MinnesotaCrimeWave.org.

Hart has taught introductory classes for mystery writers at The Loft Literary Center in Minneapolis for many years. She and Kathy, her partner of over thirty years, lived in Minneapolis until 2012 when they downsized and now live in Eden Prairie, Minnesota.

Awards and honors
In 2010, Ellen Hart received the Golden Crown Literary Society's Trailblazer Award.

Bibliography

Anthology contributions

 Murder, They Wrote, edited by Martin H. Greenberg and Elizabeth Foxwell (1997)
 The Milk of Human Kindness, edited by Lori L. Lake (2004)
 Writes of Spring: Stories and Prose, edited by Gary Schulze and Pat Frovarp (2012)
 Malice Domestic 15: Mystery Most Theatrical (2020)

Anthologies edited

 Resort to Murder, edited with Carl Brookins (2007)

Jane Lawless series
 Hallowed Murder (1989)
 Vital Lies (1991)
 Stage Fright (1992) 
 A Killing Cure (1993)
 A Small Sacrifice (1994) 
 Faint Praise (1995) 
 Robber's Wine (1996) 
 Wicked Games (1998) 
 Hunting The Witch (1999)
 The Merchant of Venus (2001)
 Immaculate Midnight (2001)
 An Intimate Ghost (2004) 
 The Iron Girl (2005) 
 Night Vision (2006) 
 The Mortal Groove (2007) 
 Sweet Poison (2008)
 The Mirror and the Mask (2009) 
 The Cruel Ever After (2010) 
 The Lost Women of Lost Lake (2011)
 Rest for the Wicked (2012) 
 Taken by the Wind (2013)
 The Old Deep and Dark (2014) 
 The Grave Soul (2015)
 Fever in the Dark (2017)
 A Whisper of Bones (2018) 
Twisted at the Root (2019)
In A Midnight Wood (2020)

Sophie Greenway series
 This Little Piggy Went to Murder (1994)
 For Every Evil (1995)
 The Oldest Sin (1996)
 Murder in the Air (1997)
 Slice and Dice (2000)
 Dial M For Meat Loaf (2001)
 Death on a Silver Platter (2003)
 No Reservations Required (2005)

References

External links
 Ellen Hart's Web Page
 Minnesota Crime Wave
 All Things Gay Interview with Ellen Hart
Ellen Hart talks about her book Faint Praise, another in the Jane Lawless series; interviewed by Bruce Southworth, Northern Lights TV Series #354 (1996):  [https://reflections.mndigital.org/catalog/p16022coll38:67#/kaltura_video]
Ellen Hart talks about her book A Killing Cure and other books in the Jane Lawless series; interviewed by Barbara Haugen, Northern Lights TV Series #275 (1993):  [https://reflections.mndigital.org/catalog/p16022coll38:289#/kaltura_video]
Mystery Writers Panel with Ellen Hart, Mary Logue, M.D. Lake & R.D. Zimmerman  "Mystery & Suspense Writing” - Northern Lights TV Series #251 (Part One) (1993):  [https://reflections.mndigital.org/catalog/p16022coll38:42#/kaltura_video]  “The Mystery Writing Process/Writing Tips” - Northern Lights TV Series #252 (Part Two) (1993):  [https://reflections.mndigital.org/catalog/p16022coll38:43#/kaltura_video] 

20th-century American novelists
21st-century American novelists
American mystery writers
Lambda Literary Award winners
American lesbian writers
Living people
Writers from Minneapolis
1949 births
Novelists from Minnesota
Women mystery writers
American LGBT novelists
LGBT people from Maine
American women novelists
20th-century American women writers
21st-century American women writers